Darryll Lamont Lewis (born December 16, 1968) is an American retired professional football player who was a cornerback in the National Football League (NFL).

Lewis was born in Bellflower, California.  After going to high school at Nogales High School in La Puente, California, he graduated in 1991 from the University of Arizona and was then drafted by the Houston Oilers (later the Tennessee Titans) in the second round (38th overall) of that year's NFL Draft. He was then traded to the San Diego Chargers in 1999 and again in 2000. He was named to the Pro Bowl in 1995 and was released by the Denver Broncos in 2001 after a 10-year career. He was inducted into the Arizona Sports Hall of Fame in 1995. 

Lewis finished his career with 32 interceptions, which he returned for 555 yards and 5 touchdowns.  He also recorded 5 sacks and 8 fumble recoveries, which he returned for 139 yards and one touchdown.

After Playing Career

Lewis began a coaching career, and was hired in March 2003 to coach the Oregon State University defensive backs. He resigned two months later, with the school citing personal reasons.

In 2006, Darryll pleaded no contest to charges in two cases, and was sentenced to 32 months in prison by Supreme Court Judge Mark Nelson. The cases were related to felony counts of evading arrest and possession of methamphetamine, and misdemeanor charges of resisting arrest and taking a vehicle without the owner's consent.

References

External links

Profile at databasefootball.com

1968 births
Living people
All-American college football players
American Conference Pro Bowl players
American football cornerbacks
Arizona Wildcats football players
Houston Oilers players
People from Bellflower, California
Players of American football from California
San Diego Chargers players
Sportspeople from Los Angeles County, California
Tennessee Oilers players